Charles Frederick Whittlesey (1867–1941) was an American architect best known for his work in the American southwest, and for pioneering work in reinforced concrete in California.

Life 

Born in Alton, Illinois, Whittlesey was a draftsman for Louis Sullivan before opening his own Chicago practice.  Many of Whittlesey's major commissions show Sullivan's influence.

In 1900, at the age of 33, Whittlesey was appointed Chief Architect for the Atchison, Topeka, and Santa Fe Railway.  Among many other stations and hotels for the railroad, he designed the El Tovar Hotel, the former Harvey House situated just 20 ft from the south rim of the Grand Canyon in Arizona, United States.  It stands at the northern terminus of the Grand Canyon Railway, formerly a branch of the Santa Fe. The hotel is one of only a handful of Harvey House facilities still in operation, and is an example of National Park Service Rustic architecture.  The razed Alvarado Hotel in Albuquerque, New Mexico was also his design, with interior work done by Mary Colter.

Whittlesey moved to San Francisco in 1907 and worked mainly there and in Los Angeles, becoming known for his early work in reinforced concrete.

Whittlesey's son Austin C. Whittlesey (1893–1950) was also an architect, apprenticed in the office of Bertram Goodhue for seven years, and was active in Southern California in the 1930s.  While working as staff designer for Allison & Allison he designed the 1930 Southern California Edison Building, across the street from Goodhue's L.A. Public Library.

Work 
 Central School, 1897, Riverside, Illinois 
 the Alvarado Hotel, Albuquerque, New Mexico, 1902, with the interior by Mary Colter  (razed)
 Whittlesey House, Albuquerque, New Mexico, 1903 (now known as the Albuquerque Press Club)
 Santa Fe Railroad Depot, Berkeley, California, 1903
 the Riordan family homes, now the Riordan Mansion State Historic Park, in Flagstaff, Arizona, 1904
 the George Babbitt home, 1904 Flagstaff, Arizona (burned down circa 1960)
 First Methodist Episcopal Church, Albuquerque, New Mexico, 1904
 Santa Fe railroad depot Shawnee, Oklahoma. Built in 1904, the building is made of limestone blocks two to three feet thick, and assembled in the Romanesque revival style. The depot's floor plan is based on the style of early European churches. A tower resembling a Scottish lighthouse rises up from the east side of a multi-arched portico. The beautiful ceilings of the depot are made of stained boxcar siding. The structure was put on the National Register of Historic Places in 1974. In 1977, it was traded to the City of Shawnee and is now open to the public as the Historical Society of Pottawatomie County.
 Hotel Hayward, Los Angeles, 1905
 El Tovar Hotel, Grand Canyon, Arizona, 1905. "The most expensively constructed pointed log house in America."
 Clune's Auditorium, Los Angeles, 1905–06, billed as the largest reinforced concrete structure in California, later redubbed the Philharmonic Auditorium.  The auditorium "exhibited some of the most enthusiastic Sullivanesque ornament to be found in Southern California."  This Moorish Revival building, described as "one of the most beautiful buildings in Los Angeles" was demolished in 1985.  The site is now (2012) a parking lot.
 Hotel Wentworth, Pasadena, California, 1907, later purchased by Henry E. Huntington, reworked by Myron Hunt, and reopened as the Huntington Hotel in 1914.  In 1954 the hotel complex was sold to the Sheraton Hotel chain.
 Pacific Building, San Francisco, 1907, "remarkable for its Sullivanesque terra cotta ornament", now the Palomar Hotel
 Lycurgus Lindsay House, Los Angeles, 1908
 Hueter Building,  816 Mission Street, San Francisco, 1908 
 Apartment building, 1230-38 Taylor Street, San Francisco, 1909,
 seven historic houses in the Russian Hill District, San Francisco, 1910-1913
 Old Student Union, Stanford, Stanford, California, 1915 
 The Leiman House on Euclid Avenue, Berkeley, California, 1921.  Originally built as a side-by-side duplex home, it was converted to a single family in the 1980s by E. Lofting, then converted back to a duplex in 2011
 El Rey Hotel, Los Angeles, 1923
 the Moorish-influenced Mayflower Hotel, Los Angeles, 1927

Gallery

References 

20th-century American architects
Concrete pioneers
American railway architects
American Craftsman architects
Gothic Revival architects
Rustic style architects
1867 births
1941 deaths
Architects from Chicago
Architects from Los Angeles
Atchison, Topeka and Santa Fe Railway people
People from Alton, Illinois